Charles Wayne Vaughan (born October 6, 1947) is a former Major League Baseball pitcher who played for two seasons. He pitched for the Atlanta Braves for one game during the 1966 Atlanta Braves season and one game during the 1969 Atlanta Braves season.  Vaughn was the youngest player to play in the MLB in 1966, the second youngest being Nolan Ryan.  Vaughan had one career hit in four at bats.

External links

1947 births
Living people
Major League Baseball pitchers
Atlanta Braves players
Omaha Royals players
Greenwood Braves players
Richmond Braves players
Shreveport Braves players
Austin Braves players
Baseball players from Texas
People from Mercedes, Texas